The Zombies is the debut American studio album by English pop rock band the Zombies, released in January 1965 by Parrot Records. After the success of the double-sided hit single "She's Not There" b/w "You Make Me Feel Good" reached #2 on the U.S. charts in the fall of 1964, Parrot quickly released this LP in 1965 (PA 61001). The dozen tracks were taken from material the Zombies cut for their UK debut album, Begin Here. Also included are "It's Alright With Me" and "Sometimes" from their self-titled EP. The album also included their 2nd hit single "Tell Her No".

Reception
In his retrospective review of the release, critic Lindsay Planer for AllMusic wrote "The Zombies' obvious appreciation for adeptly crafted melodies and rich vocal harmonies likewise made them favorites of pop fans as well as more discerning listeners."

Track listing

Personnel
The Zombies
Colin Blunstone - lead vocals and backing vocals, tambourine
Chris White - bass and backing vocals
Paul Atkinson - electric guitar
Rod Argent - lead vocals and backing vocals, electric piano and organ
Hugh Grundy - drums

References

Zombies, The
Zombies, The
Parrot Records albums